Gavin Whyte (born 31 January 1996) is a Northern Irish professional footballer who plays as a midfielder for Cardiff City and the Northern Ireland national team.

Club career

Crusaders
Whyte's Crusaders team won three league titles in four years between 2015 and 2018 and he attracted interest from Scotland and England, most notably in trials with Premier League side Everton and Scottish side Celtic during the summer of 2016.

Whyte received the Player of the Round after his performance in the Scottish Challenge Cup quarter-finals in a game against defending champions Dundee United, when he netted an injury-time winner to send  Crusaders into the semi-finals against Inverness Caledonian Thistle.

During the 2017–18 season he scored 23 goals in 20 games, winning his third NIFL Premiership league title and also the County Antrim Shield with Crusaders, and was voted the Ulster Footballer of the Year award for 2017–18 and also the Northern Ireland Football Writers' Association Player of the Year award for 2017–18.

Oxford United
On 13 July 2018, Oxford United announced the signing of Whyte on a three-year deal, for an undisclosed transfer fee. He made his debut as an 82nd-minute substitute in Oxford's opening league match of the season, a 4–0 away defeat at Barnsley. His first start, and first goal, came in the first round of the EFL Cup against Coventry City ten days later; Whyte scored the second goal in a 2–0 win for Oxford. His first league goal followed in the next game, when he scored the opener in a 2–3 home defeat to Accrington Stanley. On 22 April 2019, Whyte scored his first hat-trick for the club, in a 2–3 away win against Shrewsbury Town. By the end of his first and only season with Oxford, he had scored 9 times in 47 appearances (7 of them in League One matches).

Cardiff City
On 30 July 2019, Whyte signed for Championship club Cardiff City for an undisclosed seven-figure fee. He made his debut on the opening day of the 2019–20 season as a substitute in place of Josh Murphy during a 3–2 defeat to Wigan Athletic.

Whyte joined League One club Hull City on a six-month loan deal on 14 January 2021. He made his debut on 16 January 2021 in a 1–1 draw at home to Blackpool. The following match on 19 January 2021, he scored in the 3–0 home win against Accrington Stanley.

On 31 July 2021, Whyte signed a one-year loan deal with Oxford United.

International career

On 14 March 2018, after impressing for Crusaders, Whyte was called up the Northern Ireland U21 squad by Manager Ian Baraclough for matches against Spain U21s and Iceland U21s in the European Under-21 Championships qualifying group stage fixtures. He impressed on 26 March 2018, as Northern Ireland U21 played out a goalless draw with Iceland.

On 16 May 2018, after impressing at club level and for the U21s, Whyte was named in Northern Ireland's squad ahead of friendlies against Panama and Costa Rica.

On 11 September 2018 Whyte scored on his Northern Ireland senior debut, scoring after 108 seconds in a 3–0 win against Israel at Windsor Park.

Career statistics

Club

International

Scores and results list Northern Ireland's goal tally first.

Honours
Hull City
EFL League One: 2020–21

References

External links

1996 births
Living people
Association footballers from Northern Ireland
Northern Ireland under-21 international footballers
Northern Ireland international footballers
Association football forwards
Crusaders F.C. players
Oxford United F.C. players
Cardiff City F.C. players 
Hull City A.F.C. players
NIFL Premiership players
English Football League players
Ulster Footballers of the Year
Northern Ireland Football Writers' Association Players of the Year